A special election was held on April 11, 2017, to determine the member of the United States House of Representatives for Kansas's 4th congressional district after the incumbent, Mike Pompeo, resigned because of his nomination by President Donald Trump as Director of the Central Intelligence Agency. Republican Ron Estes received 52.2% of the vote and won, while runner-up Democrat James Thompson lost with 46% of the vote.

Background

Kansas's 4th congressional district is located in the south-center region of the state, centering on the city of Wichita and Sedgwick County, which contain approximately two-thirds of the district's voters. Sixteen other counties make up the rest of the district, including Barber, Butler, Chautauqua, Comanche, Cowley, Edwards, Elk, Greenwood, Harper, Harvey, Kingman, Kiowa, Pratt, Stafford, and Sumner counties, as well as a portion of southwestern Pawnee County. Regarded as a conservative district, the seat is considered to be safe for Republicans; the Fourth District had a Cook Partisan Voting Index of R+15 following the 2016 presidential election. Going into the election, the seat had not been held by a Democrat in more than twenty years, since Dan Glickman lost his reelection campaign in the 1994 midterms. At the time of the special election, the Republican Party held about a 2-to-1 advantage in voter registration in the district, with 186,850 registered Republicans to 95,788 registered Democrats. Republican Donald Trump won the district by a 27-point margin in the 2016 presidential election, receiving 60% of the vote to Democrat Hillary Clinton's 33%. Republican Mitt Romney defeated Democrat Barack Obama by a similar 26-point margin in 2012, taking approximately 62% of the vote to Obama's 36%.

Election 
On January 23, 2017, the U.S. representative for Kansas's 4th congressional district, Mike Pompeo, resigned after being nominated by President Donald Trump as Director of the Central Intelligence Agency. He was confirmed by the United States Senate. Gov. Sam Brownback had five days to declare a special election to be held between 45 and 60 days after being called. The day following Pompeo's resignation, Brownback declared a special election to take place on April 11.

Nominees for each party were selected by a district convention of party activists. Independent candidates were eligible to gain ballot access upon submitting 3,000 signatures within the first 25 days after the election was called.

Although not initially expecting a close race, the National Republican Congressional Committee (NRCC) spent $100,000 on advertising in the last week of the campaign, and Republican politicians Sen. Ted Cruz of Texas, President Donald Trump, and Vice President Mike Pence recorded robocalls or campaigned in person supporting their nominee Ron Estes. On April 10, the Cook Political Report moved the rating of the district to Lean Republican. Estes won the election by 6.2% over political newcomer James Thompson. This not only marked a dramatic shift from the 61.6%–29.6% margin that Pompeo had been re-elected by in the previous year's regularly-scheduled election, but this was also the closest race in the district since incumbent Todd Tiahrt, who held the seat from 1995 to 2011, edged out Democrat Randy Rathburn by 3% in 1996.

Republican Party
The Republican Party selected a nominee at a convention held on February 9, 2017.

Candidates

Nominated
 Ron Estes, State Treasurer

Eliminated at convention
 Joseph Ashby, former radio talk show host
 George Bruce, attorney
 Alan Cobb, former Donald Trump campaign staffer
 Todd Tiahrt, former U.S. Representative

Withdrawn
 Eric Kidwell, attorney
 Pete Meitzner, Wichita City Councilman

Declined
 Willis Hartman, businessman
 Mark Hutton, state representative
 Mark Kahrs, state representative
 Ty Masterson, state senator
 Michael O'Donnell, Sedgwick County Commissioner
 Susan Wagle, President of the State Senate

Endorsements

Results

Democratic Party
The Democratic Party selected a nominee at a convention held on February 11, 2017.

Candidates

Nominated
 James Thompson, attorney and U.S. Army veteran

Eliminated at convention
 Laura Lombard, entrepreneur
 Dennis McKinney, former Kansas State Treasurer and former Minority leader of the Kansas House of Representatives
 Robert Tillman, nominee for this seat in 2012 and candidate for this seat in 2016
 Charlie Walker, police officer

Withdrawn
 Kevass Harding, former Wichita School Board member

Declined
 Carl Brewer, former mayor of Wichita
 Dan Giroux, attorney and nominee for this seat in 2016
 Henry Helgerson, state representative
 Jim Ward, state representative

Endorsements

Results

Libertarian Party
The Libertarian Party selected a nominee at a convention held on February 11, 2017.

Candidates

Nominated
 Chris Rockhold, educator

Eliminated at convention
 Gordon Bakken, candidate for this seat in 2016
 John Kostner, farmer and rancher

Results

General election

Predictions

Polling

Results
The Associated Press called the election for Estes while he was leading by 6% with 88% of precincts reporting. The lead was 6.2% when all the votes were tallied.

See also 
 List of special elections to the United States House of Representatives
 2016 United States House of Representatives elections in Kansas
 2005 Ohio's 2nd congressional district special election

Notes

References

External links
Official campaign websites
 Ron Estes (R) for Congress
 Chris Rockhold (L) for Congress
 James Thompson (D) for Congress

April 2017 events in the United States
Kansas 2017 04
Kansas 2017 04
2017 04 Special
Kansas 04 Special
United States House of Representatives 04 Special
United States House of Representatives 2017 04